Maryam Salour (born 24 September 1954 in Tehran) is an Iranian sculptor, ceramist and painter. She lives in Tehran, and previously lived in Paris.

Early life and education
After receiving high school diploma in Tehran, Iran, Salour moved to London to study computer science in 1974–75. She continued her computer education in École Superieure des Informatiques. Paris, France and graduated in 1980. During the period of 1984–80 she worked at Khayat Publishing in Paris as calligrapher, line art designer and workshop supervisor. In 1986 she attended the course of Ceramic Studies at Academy de Savigny in Paris.

In 1987 Salour moved to Tehran and started her own workshop, practicing ceramics, sculpture and painting.

Career
Mayam Salour holds extensive knowledge and understanding of Iran's contemporary art. She has prepared eight programs for the BBC World Service, including two programs on young blind Iranian painters. She also conducts summer ceramic classes for children and young people.

She has held more than 23 solo exhibitions in Iran, United States, Switzerland and United Kingdom and more took part in more than 24 group exhibitions in Iran, the UAE, Germany, France, the US and Venezuela. Salour was the director of the 8th Iranian National Biennial of Ceramic Arts in Tehran.

See also 
 List of Iranian women artists

References

External links 
 "Mryam Salour in Saatchi Art"
 "Mryam Salour in Tavoos Art Magazine"

1954 births
Living people
Iranian women painters
Iranian sculptors
Iranian women sculptors
Iranian potters
Women potters
21st-century women artists
21st-century ceramists
Iranian women ceramists
Women calligraphers